The architecture of Samoa is characterised by openness, with the design mirroring the culture and life of the Samoan people who inhabit the Samoa Islands. Architectural concepts are incorporated into Samoan proverbs, oratory and metaphors, as well as linking to other art forms in Samoa, such as boat building and tattooing. The spaces outside and inside of traditional Samoan architecture are part of cultural form, ceremony and ritual.

 is the Samoan word for all types of houses, from small to large.

In general, traditional Samoan architecture is characterized by an oval or circular shape, with wooden posts holding up a domed roof. There are no walls. The base of the architecture is a skeleton frame.

Before European arrival and the availability of Western materials, a Samoan  did not use any metal in its construction.

Lashing 

The  is lashed and tied together with a plaited sennit rope called , handmade from dried coconut fibre. The husks are soaked in fresh water to soften the interfibrous portion. The husks from mature nuts must be soaked from four to five weeks, or perhaps even longer, and very mature fibre is best soaked in salt water, but the green husk from a special variety of coconut is ready in four or five days.
Soaking is considered to improve the quality of the fibre. Old men or women then beat the husk with a mallet on a wooden anvil to separate the fibres, which, after a further washing to remove interfibrous material, are tied together in bundles and dried in the sun. When this stage is completed, the fibres are manufactured into sennit by plaiting, a task usually done by elderly men or matai, and performed at their leisure. This usually involves them seated on the ground rolling the dried fibre strands against their bare thigh by hand, until heavier strands are formed. These long, thin strands are then woven together into a three-ply plait, often in long lengths, which is the finished sennit. The sennit is then coiled in bundles or wound tightly in very neat cylindrical rolls.

The lashing construction of the Samoan  is one of the great architectural achievements of Polynesia. A similar lashing technique was also used in traditional boat building, where planks of wood were 'sewn' together in parts.  has many other uses in Samoan material culture, including ceremonial items, such as the  fly whisk, a symbol of orator status. This lashing technique was also used in other parts of Polynesia, such as the magimagi of Fiji.

Cultural space

The space also defines the position where the  makers in the ʻava ceremony are seated and the open area for the presentation and exchanging of cultural items such as the ʻie toga fine mats.

The front of a Samoan house is that part that faces the main thoroughfare or road through the village. The middle posts, termed  are reserved for the leading chiefs and the side posts on the front section, termed  are occupied by the orators. The posts at the back of the house, indicate the positions maintained by the  makers and others serving the gathering.

The term is also used to describe certain buildings and their functions.

The site on which the house is built is called  (place to stand).

Diagrams of  Samoa

Diagrams of  showing architectural parts of a traditional house in the Samoan language; from An Account of Samoan History up to 1918 by Samoan historian Teo Tuvale.

The builders in Samoan architecture were also the architects, and they belonged to an exclusive ancient guild of master builders, . The Samoan word  denotes the status of master craftsmen who have achieved the highest rank in skill and knowledge in a particular traditional art form. The words  mean house builder.
Contracting the services of a  required negotiations and cultural custom.

Types of 

The  (big house), the most important house, is usually round in shape, and serves as a meeting house for chief council meetings, family gatherings, funerals or chief title investitures. The  is always situated at the front of all other houses in an extended family complex. The houses behind it serve as living quarters, with an outdoor cooking area at the rear of the compound. The , (similar to the concept of marae in Māori and other Polynesian cultures), is usually a well-kept, grassy lawn or sandy area. The  is an important cultural space where interactions between visitors and hosts or outdoor formal gatherings take place.

The open characteristics of Samoan architecture are also mirrored in the overall pattern of house sites in a village, where all  are situated prominently at the fore of all other dwellings in the village, and sometimes form a semicircle, usually facing seawards.

In modern times, with the decline of traditional architecture and the availability of western building materials, the shape of the  has become rectangular, though the spatial areas in custom and ceremony remain the same.

The  (small house), traditionally long in shape, was an addition to the main house. It is not so well-constructed and is situated always at the back of the main dwelling. In modern times, the term is also used for any type of small and simple , which is not the main house of dwelling. Popular as a "grass hut" or beach fale in village tourism, many are raised about a meter off the ground on stilts, sometimes with an iron roof. In a village, families build a  beside the main house or by the sea for resting during the heat of the day or as an extra sleeping space at night if there are guests.

The  (cook house) is a flimsy structure, small in size, and not to be considered as a house.

Construction

The  oversees the entire building project. Before construction, the family prepares the building site. Lava, coral, sand or stone materials are usually used for this purpose. The , his assistants and men from the family cut the timber from the forest.

The main supporting posts, erected first, vary in number, size and length depending on the shape and dimensions of the house.

These wide strips are called .

Timber

Most of the timber is grown in forests on family land. The timber was cut in the forest and carried to the building site in the village. The heavy work involved the builder's assistants, members of the family and help from the village community.

The long principal rafters had to be flexible, so coconut wood was always selected. The breadfruit tree was also used for other parts of the main framework.

In general, the timbers most frequently used in the construction of Samoan houses are:

Thatch

The completed, domed framework is covered with thatch ( leaves), which is made by the women. The best quality of thatch is made with the dry leaves of the sugarcane. If sugarcane leaf was not available, the palm leaves of the coconut tree were used in the same manner.

These sections of thatch are fastened to the outside of the framework of the  beginning at the bottom and working up to the apex. This means there is a double layer of thatch covering the whole house.

Provided the best quality of thatch is used and it has been properly laid, it will last about seven years. On an ordinary dwelling house, about 3000 sections of thatch are laid.

Pola
Protection from sun, wind or rain, as well as from prying eyes, was achieved by suspending from the  running round the house several of a sort of drop-down Venetian blind, called . The fronds of the coconut tree are plaited into a kind of mat about a foot wide and three feet long. Usually, one string of these mats covers the space between two  and so on round the house. They do not last for long, but being quickly made, are soon replaced. They afford ample protection from the elements, and it is possible to let them down in sections; seldom is the whole house is closed up.

Flooring
The natural foundations of a  site are coral, sand, and lava, with sometimes a few inches of soil in some localities. Drainage is therefore good. The top layers of the flooring are smooth pebbles and stones. When occupied, the house floors are usually covered or partially covered with native mats.

In modern times, concrete is used for flooring.

Mythology

In Samoan mythology, an explanation of why Samoan houses are round is explained in a story about the god Tagaloa, also known as Tagaloalagi (Tagaloa of the Heavens).

Following is the story, as told by Samoan historian Te'o Tuvale in An Account of Samoan History up to 1918:

During the time of Tagaloalagi, the houses in Samoa varied in shape, and this led to many difficulties for those who wished to have a house built in a certain manner. Each carpenter was proficient in building a house of one particular shape only, and it was sometimes impossible to obtain the services of the carpenter desired. A meeting of all the carpenters in the country was held to try to decide on some uniform shape. The discussion waxed enthusiastic, and as there seemed no prospect of a decision being arrived at, it was decided to call in the services of Tagaloalagi. After considering the matter, he pointed to the dome of Heaven and to the horizon and he decreed that in future, all houses built would be of that shape, and this explains why all the ends of Samoan houses are as the shape of the heavens extending down to the horizon.

An important tree in Samoan architecture is the coconut palm. In Samoan mythology, the first coconut tree is told in a legend called Sina and the Eel.

European architecture

See also

Fa'amatai, the chiefly system of Samoa
Culture of Samoa

References
The Samoan House, An Account of Samoan History up to 1918 by Te'o Tuvale NZ Electronic Text Centre, NZ Licence CC-BY-SA 3.0 Retrieved 26 October 2009

Notes

 
Samoan culture
Vernacular architecture
Oceanian architecture